This is a list of cities, towns and villages in the province of Flevoland, in the Netherlands.

References 
 GEOnet Names Server (GNS)
 ANWB Topografische Atlas Nederland, 2005

 
Flevoland-related lists
Flevoland